Camajuaní I (or Camajuaní One) is a consejo popular ("ward") in Camajuaní, Cuba. Combined with Camajuani II they have a population of 21,700.

Geography 
The popular council borders Camajuaní II, Sabana, José María Pérez, and Vega de Palma.

References

Populated places in Villa Clara Province
1988 establishments in North America
Populated places established in 1988
1988 establishments in Cuba